

Champions

Major League Baseball
World Series: Los Angeles Dodgers over New York Yankees (4–2); Ron Cey, Pedro Guerrero, and Steve Yeager, co-MVPs

NOTE: Due to a strike in mid-season, the season was divided into a first half and a second half. The division winner of the first half (denoted East 1, West 1) played the division winner of the second half (denoted East 2, West 2).
American League Championship Series MVP: Graig Nettles
National League Championship Series MVP: Burt Hooton
All-Star Game, August 9 at Cleveland Stadium: National League, 5–4; Gary Carter, MVP

Other champions
Minor League Baseball
AAA
American Association: Denver Bears (Montreal Expos)
International League: Columbus Clippers (New York Yankees)
Pacific Coast League: Albuquerque Dukes (Los Angeles Dodgers)
Mexican League: Diablos Rojos del México
AA
Eastern League: Bristol Red Sox (Boston Red Sox)
Southern League: Orlando Twins (Minnesota Twins)
Texas League: Jackson Mets (New York Mets)
A
California League: Rancho Cucamonga Quakes (Los Angeles Dodgers)
Carolina League: Hagerstown Suns (Baltimore Orioles)
Florida State League: Daytona Beach Astros (Houston Astros)
Midwest League: Wausau Timbers (Seattle Mariners)
South Atlantic League: Greensboro Hornets (New York Yankees)
New York–Penn League: Oneonta Yankees (New York Yankees)
Northwest League: Medford Athletics (Oakland Athletics)
Rookie
Appalachian League: Paintsville Yankees (New York Yankees)
Gulf Coast League: Royals Gold (Kansas City Royals)
Pioneer League: Butte Copper Kings (Milwaukee Brewers)
International
Cuban National Series: Vegueros de Pinar del Río
Japan Series: Yomiuri Giants over Nippon-Ham Fighters (4–2)
Winter Leagues
1981 Caribbean Series: Leones del Escogido
Dominican Republic League: Leones del Escogido
Mexican Pacific League: Yaquis de Obregón
Puerto Rican League: Criollos de Caguas
Venezuelan League: Leones del Caracas
College
College World Series: Arizona State
Youth
Big League World Series: Taipei, Taiwan
Junior League World Series: Boardman, Ohio
Little League World Series: Tai-Ping, Taichung, Taiwan
Senior League World Series: Georgetown, Delaware

Awards and honors
Baseball Hall of Fame
Rube Foster
Bob Gibson
Johnny Mize
Most Valuable Player
Rollie Fingers, Milwaukee Brewers, P (AL)
Mike Schmidt, Philadelphia Phillies, 3B (NL)
Cy Young Award
Rollie Fingers, Milwaukee Brewers (AL)
Fernando Valenzuela, Los Angeles Dodgers (NL)
Rookie of the Year
Dave Righetti, New York Yankees, P (AL)
Fernando Valenzuela, Los Angeles Dodgers, P (NL)
Gold Glove Award
Mike Squires (1B) (AL) 
Frank White (2B) (AL) 
Buddy Bell (3B) (AL) 
Alan Trammell (SS) (AL) 
Dwight Evans (OF) (AL) 
Rickey Henderson (OF) (AL) 
Dwayne Murphy (OF) (AL)
Jim Sundberg (C) (AL) 
Mike Norris (P) (AL)

MLB statistical leaders

Major league Baseball final standings

First half of season

Second half of season

Overall record

Events

January–March
January 8 – The Cincinnati Reds sign free agent first baseman Larry Biittner. The Reds become the last team to sign a free agent under the system established in 1976.
January 15:
In his first year of eligibility, former St. Louis Cardinals pitcher Bob Gibson is the only person elected this year to the Hall of Fame by the Baseball Writers' Association of America, gathering 337 votes (84.04%). Players falling short of the 301 votes needed for election include Don Drysdale (243), Gil Hodges (241), Harmon Killebrew (239), Hoyt Wilhelm (238) and Juan Marichal (233).
The Toronto Blue jays purchase the contract of Ken Macha from the Montreal Expos.
January 23 – Fred Lynn traded by the Boston Red Sox with Steve Renko to the California Angels for Frank Tanana, Jim Dorsey, and Joe Rudi.
January 26 – The California Angels sign pitchers Jesse Jefferson and Bill Travers.
February 4 – The Chicago White Sox sign free agent infielder Bill Almon.
February 5 – The New York Mets release outfielder Elliott Maddox.
February 9 – The San Francisco Giants sign Joe Morgan.
February 11 – The Houston Astros trade catcher Bruce Bochy to the New York Mets for two players to be named later. Minor league players Randy Rogers and Stan Hough would be sent to Houston on April 3 to complete the trade.
February 12 – Reputedly because the Boston Red Sox mailed out his contract two days late, catcher Carlton Fisk is declared a free agent.  He will later sign with the Chicago White Sox.
February 18 – The Cleveland Indians release catcher Manny Sanguillen, bringing a close to Sanguillen's career.
February 23 – The Pittsburgh Pirates sign pitcher Luis Tiant.
February 28 – The New York Mets reacquire Dave Kingman from the Chicago Cubs for Steve Henderson and cash. Henderson had originally been acquired by the Mets from the Cincinnati Reds as part of the infamous "Midnight Massacre" on June 15, the same day the Mets traded Kingman to the San Diego Padres for Paul Siebert and Bobby Valentine.
March 1 – The Texas Rangers sign Ed Figueroa.
March 3 – The St. Louis Cardinals sign Steve Braun.
March 4 – The San Francisco Giants sell the contract of outfielder Terry Whitfield to the Seibu Lions of the Pacific League in Japan.
March 11 – Johnny Mize and Rube Foster are elected to the Hall of Fame by the Special Veterans Committee. Mize hit .312 with 359 home runs in 15 seasons for the Cardinals and New York Giants, while Foster was a star pitcher, manager and  pioneer of the Negro leagues during the first quarter of the 20th century.
March 18 – Carlton Fisk officially signs a contract with the Chicago White Sox.
March 25 – The Atlanta Braves trade outfielder Gary Matthews to the Philadelphia Phillies for pitcher Bob Walk.
March 30 – The Philadelphia Phillies sell the contract of Greg Luzinski to the Chicago White Sox.

April
April 1 – The California Angels make multiple trades. The first trade they send first baseman Jason Thompson to the Pittsburgh Pirates for pitcher Mickey Mahler and catcher Ed Ott. In the second trade, the Angels send starting shortstop Dickie Thon to the Houston Astros for pitcher Ken Forsch
April 3 – The Detroit Tigers release pitcher Chris Codiroli.
April 5 – The San Diego Padres acquire Dave Dravecky from the Pittsburgh Pirates in exchange for outfielder Bobby Mitchell.
April 7 – The Kansas City Royals sign catcher Jerry Grote as a free agent. 
April 9 – After pitcher Jerry Reuss pulls a muscle, rookie Fernando Valenzuela is given his first starting assignment.  His first Major League start results in a five-hit shutout.  It is the beginning of what will be called "Fernandomania" in Southern California.
April 10 – Carlton Fisk debuts with the Chicago White Sox, coincidentally in Fenway Park against his former team, the Boston Red Sox. Fisk hits a three-run home run in the eighth to secure a 5–3 win for Chicago.
April 11 - Don Sutton was back in Dodger Stadium, but for the first time in 15 years, he was not pitching for the Dodgers, instead he's pitching for the Houston Astros. The Dodgers welcomed their former ace back by lighting him up for 6 runs on 8 hits in 4 innings as the Dodgers beat the Astros, 7–4.
April 14 – The Oakland Athletics sign Chris Codiroli
April 17 – The Texas Rangers sign Bobby Bonds.
April 18 – Tom Seaver of the Cincinnati Reds records his 3000th career strikeout.  Keith Hernandez is the victim.
April 19 - in game one a twi-light doubleheader, the Oakland Athletics set a new Major League record by starting the season with 11-0 with a 6-1 win over the Seattle Mariners before 29,834 fanatics at the Oakland-Alameda Coliseum.
April 27 – Just 18 days after his first start, Fernando Valenzuela has grabbed the attention of the baseball world.  In just his fifth start, he pitches his fourth complete game shutout running his record to 5–0 with a microscopic 0.20 ERA.  He is also batting over .400 to help his own cause.
April 29 – Steve Carlton of the Philadelphia Phillies records his 3000th career strikeout. April 1981 is the only month in history to have two pitchers reach this milestone.  He is the first left-handed pitcher in Major League history to reach that mark.

May
May 3 - Fernandomania rolled on as Fernando Valenzuela won his 6th straight start this year as the Dodgers beat the Montreal Expos 6-1 in 10 innings.
May 10 – In the second game of a doubleheader, Charlie Lea of the Montreal Expos no-hits the San Francisco Giants 4–0.
May 15 – Len Barker of the Cleveland Indians pitches a perfect game against the Toronto Blue Jays, 3–0, at Cleveland Municipal Stadium. He struck out 11, all swinging, after the third inning and never had a 3-ball count on any batter on a misty, rain-soaked night where only 7,290 fans took in the game. Current Indians broadcaster Rick Manning caught the 27th out of the night on a fly ball to center field.  Barker's catcher, Ron Hassey will later catch Dennis Martínez's 1991 perfect game making him the first catcher in history to catch two perfect games.
May 18 – The Philadelphia Phillies hand Fernando Valenzuela his first career loss in the major leagues, a 4–0 shutout.
May 21 – Ron Darling of Yale University pitches a no-hitter through eleven innings against St. John's University. In the 12th inning, St. John's broke up the no-hitter and then scored on a double-steal to beat Yale 1–0. Darling's performance remains the longest no-hitter in NCAA history and the game is considered by some to be the best in college baseball history. Frank Viola was the opposing pitcher for St. John's.
May 25 – Carl Yastrzemski plays in his 3,000th major league game, scoring the winning run in Boston's 8–7 triumph over Cleveland. Yaz joins Ty Cobb, Stan Musial and Hank Aaron as the fourth major leaguer to appear in 3,000 games.
May 27 – While visiting the Seattle Kingdome, Kansas City Royals centerfielder Amos Otis hits a slow roller down the third base line in the sixth inning. Seattle Mariners third baseman Lenny Randle gets on his hands and knees and tries unsuccessfully to blow the ball foul.
May 29 – The New York Mets trade pitcher Jeff Reardon and outfielder Dan Norman to the Montreal Expos for outfielder Ellis Valentine.

June–July
June 5 – Nolan Ryan issues the 1,777th walk in his career, breaking the record previously held by Early Wynn.
June 7 – The Houston Astros trade pitcher Joaquín Andújar to the St. Louis Cardinals for outfielder Tony Scott.
June 8 – With their twelfth pick in the June amateur draft, the New York Mets select Roger Clemens. He declines to sign, deciding instead to attend the University of Texas at Austin. He is drafted by the Boston Red Sox in the first round (19th overall) of the 1983 Major League Baseball draft.
 The Chicago Cubs select outfielder Joe Carter with their first round selection.
June 10 – Pete Rose hits a Nolan Ryan pitch in his first at-bat for the 3,630th safe hit of his career; tying Stan Musial's National League record for career hits.  He would strike out in his next three at-bats in the game, however, in his bid to break the record.  
June 12 – After meeting with major league owners for most of the previous day, players' union chief Marvin Miller announces, "We have accomplished nothing. The strike is on", thus beginning the longest labor action to date in baseball history. By the time the season resumes on August 10, 706 games (38 percent of the season schedule) will have been canceled. Minor League Baseball games are not affected by the strike.
June 16 – In the midst of the players' strike, William Wrigley III announces the sale of the Chicago Cubs to the Tribune Company for $20 million. This ends the decades-long association between the Wrigley family and the Cubs.
June 20 – Bernie Carbo signs a minor league deal with the Detroit Tigers. He plays in just 19 games for their Triple-A team in Evansville. 
June 23 – The Pawtucket Red Sox beat the Rochester Red Wings, 3–2, in the 33rd inning of the longest game in professional baseball history. This game had started 67 days earlier was halted in the early morning of April 19, with the score tied 2–2 after 32 innings and more than eight hours of game time.  The game ended 18 minutes after it resumed, with Dave Koza hitting an RBI-single that brought Marty Barrett with the winning run. Future Hall of Famers Wade Boggs and Cal Ripken Jr. participated for Pawtucket and Rochester, respectively.
July 11 – The Pittsburgh Pirates sign undrafted amateur free agent Bobby Bonilla.

August
August 6 – As a result of the nearly two-month interruption in play because of the strike, major league owners elect to split the 1981 season into two halves, with the first-place teams from each half in each division (or a wild card team if the same club wins both halves) meeting in a best-of-five divisional playoff series. The last time the major leagues played a split season was 1892. The Oakland Athletics, New York Yankees, Philadelphia Phillies and Los Angeles Dodgers suddenly find themselves guaranteed playoff spots as first-half champions (a problem noted at this time is that those teams will not have much left to play for in the rest of that year's regular season).
August 9 – At Cleveland Stadium, the National League wins its tenth consecutive All-Star Game over the American League, 5–4. Gary Carter hits two home runs and is selected the MVP. The 1981 Midsummer Classic becomes the second All-Star Game ever played during the month of August, the first having taken place on August 3, 1959.
August 10:
The MLB regular season resumes following the nearly two-month strike.
Pete Rose singles in the 8th inning off Mark Littell of the St. Louis Cardinals to break Stan Musial's National League record for career hits.
Cal Ripken Jr. makes his major league debut for the Baltimore Orioles as Baltimore beats the Kansas City Royals 3–2 in 12 innings in Kansas City.
August 12 - Joe Rudi, a part time starter who entered the game hitting .147 rapped a pair of home runs to lead a six-homer barrage and rookie Bobby Ojeda pitched a complete game for a Red Sox win. 
August 24:
Kent Hrbek debuts as a Minnesota Twin. His twelfth-inning home run beats the Yankees 3–2 in New York. Hrbek will go on to have a 14-year career with his hometown team.
The Philadelphia Phillies release John Vukovich, ending his major league career.

September
September 3 – The St. Louis Cardinals sell the contract of pitcher Donnie Moore to the Milwaukee Brewers.
September 4 – In the conclusion of the longest game in Fenway Park history, the Seattle Mariners beat the Boston Red Sox 8–7 in 20 innings. The game began on September 3, but was suspended after 19 innings with the score tied 7–7.
September 6 – Despite having won the first-half American League East title, New York Yankees manager Gene Michael is replaced by Bob Lemon, who managed the club in 1978–79. The Yankees are under .500 in the second half of the season.
September 6 – The Los Angeles Dodgers' Fernando Valenzuela beats the St. Louis Cardinals 5–0 to tie the National League record of seven shutouts by a rookie pitcher.
September 19 - Pete Falcone became the first New York Mets pitcher to hurl a complete game since May 29, 1981, as the New York Mets beat the St. Louis Cardinals 6-2.
September 26 – Nolan Ryan of the Houston Astros breaks the record of four no hitters by pitcher Sandy Koufax by pitching his fifth career no hitter in the Astrodome against, coincidentally, Koufax's former team, the Los Angeles Dodgers.
September 30 – The Kansas City Royals defeat the Minnesota Twins, 5–2, in the last Major League game to be played at Metropolitan Stadium, as the Twins prepare to move into the new Hubert H. Humphrey Metrodome.  Clint Hurdle hits the last outdoor Major League home run in Minnesota until Target Field opens twenty-eight seasons later in 2010.

October–December
October 3:
Bob Horner hits two home runs and scores the winning run to give the Atlanta Braves a 4–3 win over the Cincinnati Reds, and give the Houston Astros the second-half title in the NL West division. Cincinnati, which lost the first-half title to the Dodgers by one-half game, will finish with the best overall record (66–42) in the major leagues, but will miss the playoffs due to not winning either half's division title.
The Milwaukee Brewers (playing since 1970) and Montreal Expos (since 1969) clinch their first postseason appearances. Milwaukee beats Detroit 2–1 to wrap up the second-half title in the AL East division, while Montréal edges the Mets 5–4 to win the NL East division's second playoff spot. (St. Louis finishes with the best overall record in the NL East but misses the playoffs for the same reason as the Cincinnati Reds.  St. Louis would make up for the heartbreak the following season).
October 5:
The Kansas City Royals shut out Cleveland 9–0 in the first game of a scheduled doubleheader to clinch the second-half title in the AL West division. The second game is canceled as irrelevant. This was a make-up game after the scheduled season ended the day before.
Mark Fidrych is released by the Detroit Tigers. Fidrych had been an All-Star and rookie of the year a few seasons prior, and became a pop culture figure in baseball. 
October 19 – Rick Monday of the Los Angeles Dodgers hits a ninth inning home run to break a 1–1 tie, and secure a Game five victory in the National League Championship Series.  The losing Montréal Expos had been leading the series 2 games-to-one in what would be their only post season appearance.
October 21 – The New York Yankees trade outfielder Willie McGee to the St. Louis Cardinals for pitcher Bob Sykes. The trade would go on to be lopsided as McGee would become an All-Star for the Cardinals, whereas Sykes would never pitcher a game on the major league level for the Yankees and would be out of organized baseball after the 1982 season.
October 26 – The Pittsburgh Pirates released Kurt Bevacqua.
October 28:
Pedro Guerrero drives in five runs, and pitcher Burt Hooton and the Los Angeles Dodgers beat the New York Yankees, 9–2, to win the 1981 World Series in six games. In a remarkable postseason, the Dodgers rallied from a 2–0 deficit against the Astros in the division series, they rallied from a 2 games to 1 deficit against the Expos in the National League Championship series, and they rallied from a 2–0 deficit against the Yankees in the World Series. Guerrero, Ron Cey and Steve Yeager are named co-MVPs.
Pitcher George Frazier of the New York Yankees makes dubious history when he is credited with the loss in game six of the world Series, making him the first pitcher with three losses in a best of seven series since Lefty Williams of the Chicago White Sox in 1919.
November 4 – The Cincinnati Reds trade outfielder Ken Griffey Sr. to the New York Yankees in exchange for minor leaguer Brian Ryder and a player to be named later. On December 9, the Yankees sent pitcher Freddie Tolliver to the Reds to complete the trade.
November 11 – Fernando Valenzuela of the Los Angeles Dodgers wins the National League Cy Young Award, becoming the first rookie to win the award.
November 20 – In a blockbuster three team trade, the Cleveland Indians send catcher Bo Díaz to the Philadelphia Phillies; the Phillies sent Lonnie Smith to the St. Louis Cardinals; the Cardinals sent pitchers Silvio Martinez and Lary Sorensen to the Indians, and the Phillies sent a player to be named later to the Indians. The Phillies sent Scott Munninghoff to the Indians on December 9 to complete the trade.
November 25 – Rollie Fingers of the Milwaukee Brewers becomes the first relief pitcher ever to win the American League MVP Award, edging Rickey Henderson of the Oakland Athletics, 319 to 308. Fingers saved 28 games while posting a significant 1.04 ERA.
December 2 – Los Angeles Dodgers pitcher Fernando Valenzuela became the third consecutive Dodgers player to be named National League Rookie of the Year. The Mexican left-hander posted a 13–7 record with a 2.48 ERA and led the NL in strikeouts (180), games started (25), complete games (11), shutouts (eight) and innings pitched (192). His 13 wins tied him with Steve Carlton in second place behind Tom Seaver, who finished with 14. Valenzuela also made his first All-Star appearance and received both the Cy Young Award and TSN Rookie of the Year.
December 6 – The Philadelphia Phillies sell the contract of Bob Boone to the California Angels.
December 18 – The Cincinnati Reds trade Ray Knight to the Houston Astros in exchange for outfielder César Cedeño.

Movies
Don't Look Back: The Story of Leroy 'Satchel' Paige (TV)

Births

January
January 2 – Ryan Garko
January 4 – Jailen Peguero
January 5 – Andy Cavazos
January 8 – Daniel Davidson
January 8 – Jeff Francis
January 8 – Derek Thompson
January 13 – José Capellán
January 13 – Darrell Rasner
January 16 – Mitch Stetter
January 18 – Brandon Fahey
January 20 – John Baker
January 20 – Freddy Guzmán
January 21 – Wilfredo Ledezma
January 25 – Andy Machado
January 26 – Juan Lara
January 26 – Josh Sharpless
January 28 – Doug Waechter

February
February 4 – Ben Hendrickson
February 4 – Tom Mastny
February 7 – Seth McClung
February 12 – Chris Snyder
February 14 – Brad Halsey
February 16 – Sergio Mitre
February 16 – Jerry Owens
February 17 – Andrew Brown
February 18 – Alex Ríos
February 18 – Alex Serrano
February 21 – Adam Greenberg
February 21 – Tsuyoshi Wada
February 24 – Rob Bowen
February 24 – Paul McAnulty
February 28 – Brian Bannister

March
March 5 – Francisley Bueno
March 9 – Clay Rapada
March 12 – Carlos Muñiz
March 13 – Mike Avilés
March 14 – Bobby Jenks
March 16 – Curtis Granderson
March 18 – Darren Clarke
March 19 – José Castillo
March 23 – Anderson García
March 23 – Tony Peña Jr.
March 24 – Dirk Hayhurst
March 26 – Josh Wilson
March 27 – Brian Slocum
March 28 – Edwar Ramírez

April
April 2 – Brian Barden
April 2 – Mike McCoy
April 3 – Ryan Doumit
April 4 – Casey Daigle
April 5 – Jorge de la Rosa
April 8 – Brian Burres
April 8 – Matt Ford
April 9 – A. J. Ellis
April 9 – Dennis Sarfate
April 9 – Chris Smith
April 12 – Hisashi Iwakuma
April 17 – Ryan Raburn
April 18 – Brian Buscher
April 21 – Ronny Paulino
April 23 – Sean Henn
April 25 – Sean White
April 27 – Joey Gathright
April 28 – Yoslan Herrera
April 28 – Shawn Hill
April 28 – Chad Santos
April 29 – Omir Santos

May
May 1 – Manny Acosta
May 5 – Chris Duncan
May 6 – Dustin Nippert
May 8 – John Maine
May 8 – Alfredo Simón
May 9 – Bill Murphy
May 11 – Daniel Ortmeier
May 15 – Justin Morneau
May 20 – Kensuke Tanaka
May 21 – Josh Hamilton
May 24 – Penny Taylor 
May 26 – Ben Zobrist
May 28 – Daniel Cabrera
May 28 – Leo Rosales
May 30 – Reggie Willits
May 31 – Jake Peavy 
May 31 – Ray Olmedo

June
June 1 – Carlos Zambrano
June 2 – Jared Burton
June 2 – Chin-hui Tsao
June 3 – Rich Rundles
June 3 – Munenori Kawasaki
June 6 – Eddie Bonine
June 7 – Tyler Johnson
June 8 – Kevin Mahar
June 9 – Drew Anderson
June 11 – Jason Waddell
June 15 – Jeremy Reed
June 16 – Joe Saunders
June 18 – Ben Johnson
June 19 – Val Majewski
June 21 – Jeff Baker
June 21 – Garrett Jones
June 28 – Brandon Phillips

July
July 1 – Matt Carson
July 2 – Ángel Pagán
July 3 – Dan Meyer
July 4 – Francisco Cruceta
July 5 – Jesse Crain
July 7 – Jon Huber
July 9 – Tommy Hottovy
July 11 – Blaine Boyer
July 12 – Phil Dumatrait
July 12 – Sam Narron
July 19 – Jimmy Gobble
July 22 – Ángel Chávez
July 23 – Hong-Chih Kuo
July 25 – Kevin Kouzmanoff

August
August 3 – Travis Bowyer
August 3 – Félix Sánchez
August 5 – Carl Crawford
August 5 – Tripp Gibson
August 8 – Eddy Rodríguez
August 10 – Fernando Cortez
August 13 – Cory Doyne
August 13 – Randy Messenger
August 14 – Chris Sáenz
August 15 – Óliver Pérez
August 18 – Pat Misch
August 24 – Omar Beltré
August 28 – Yuniesky Maya
August 29 – Drew Meyer
August 30 – Adam Wainwright
August 31 – Dennis Dove
August 31 – Ramón Ramírez

September
September 3 – Jake Woods
September 6 – Mark Teahen
September 10 – Kameron Loe
September 10 – Connor Robertson
September 12 – Franquelis Osoria
September 13 – Justin James
September 14 – Cody Clark
September 17 – Casey Janssen
September 19 – Scott Baker
September 20 – Jordan Tata
September 21 – Scott Rice
September 21 – Billy Sadler
September 22 – Alexei Ramírez
September 25 – Rocco Baldelli
September 25 – Jason Bergmann
September 27 – Mike Esposito
September 30 – Brandon Watson

October
October 2 – Marino Salas
October 3 – Matt Murton
October 4 – Joe Thatcher
October 6 – Joel Hanrahan
October 11 – David Rackley
October 13 – Taylor Buchholz
October 14 – Boof Bonser
October 16 – Anthony Reyes
October 17 – Brett Campbell
October 17 – Edwin Maysonet
October 18 – David Murphy
October 23 – Ben Francisco
October 24 – Beltrán Pérez
October 24 – Omar Quintanilla
October 28 – Nate McLouth
October 30 – Ian Snell
October 31 – Mike Napoli
October 31 – Jared Wells

November
November 2 – Wilson Betemit
November 4 – Erick Threets
November 5 – Jarrett Grube
November 7 – Dave Krynzel
November 9 – Chuck James
November 10 – Tony Blanco
November 10 – Merkin Valdez
November 16 – Fernando Cabrera
November 19 – Jeff Gray
November 20 – Sam Fuld
November 21 – Enrique Cruz
November 22 – Óscar Villarreal
November 23 – P. J. Pilittere
November 29 – Guillermo Quiróz
November 30 – Rich Harden

December
December 3 – Chris Snelling
December 4 – Jerome Williams
December 8 – Cory Blaser
December 8 – Kory Casto
December 10 – Víctor Díaz
December 12 – Shane Costa
December 14 – Ángel Guzmán
December 14 – Shaun Marcum
December 15 – Andy González
December 15 – Lou Montañez
December 18 – Jeremy Accardo
December 20 – Chris Narveson
December 20 – James Shields
December 23 – Jordan Baker
December 25 – Willy Taveras
December 26 – Alvin Colina
December 26 – Dustin Moseley
December 26 – Omar Infante
December 27 – David Aardsma

Deaths

January
January   3 – Lou Fette, 73, All-Star (1939) pitcher who posted a 41–40 record with a 3.15 ERA in 109 games for the Boston Bees and Braves, and Brooklyn Dodgers; went 20–10 as a 30-year-old rookie for 1937 Bees; led the National League in shutouts in 1937 and 1939.
January   6 – Fred Stiely, 79, pitcher who toiled in nine games for parts of the 1929 through 1931 seasons for the St. Louis Browns of the American League.
January   7 – Irv Stein, 69, pitcher for the 1932 Philadelphia Athletics of the American League.
January 17 – Owen Kahn, 75, pinch-hitter in one game for the 1930 Boston Braves.
January 26 – Ray Oyler, 43, shortstop known for his excellent glovework with the Detroit Tigers' 1968 champions, afterwards taken in the expansion draft by the Seattle Pilots.
January 27 – Spencer Davis, 72, infielder who played in the Negro leagues between 1938 and 1942.
January 27 – Huck Geary, 64, shortstop for the Pittsburgh Pirates from 1942 to 1943.
January 30 – Marino Pieretti, 60, Italian-born pitcher who posted a 30–38 record with a 4.53 ERA for the Washington Senators, Chicago White Sox and Cleveland Indians from 1945 to 1950.
January 31 – John Dowd, 90, New York Highlanders shortstop who appeared in ten games in 1912.

February
February   2 – Al Van Camp, 77, first baseman/left fielder who played from 1928 to 1932 for the Cleveland Indians and Boston Red Sox.
February   4 – Grant Gillis, 70,  utility infielder for the Washington Senators and Boston Red Sox between 1927 and 1929.
February   5 – Jake Stephens, 80, shortstop and All-Star who played in the Negro leagues between 1923 and 1937; member of 1925 champion Hilldale Club.
February   6 – Cactus Keck, 82, pitcher for the Cincinnati Reds from 1922 to 1923.
February   7 – Clarence Eldridge, 92, lawyer and advertising executive who was a substitute umpire during the 1914 and 1915 American League seasons.
February   9 – Henry McHenry, 70, two-time All-Star pitcher as a member of the Philadelphia Stars between 1938 and 1948; over a four-season span, led Negro National League in victories (1938), complete games (1938, 1941), strikeouts (1939) and games lost (1940).
February 12 – Frank Genovese, 66, minor league outfielder and longtime scout and minor-league manager for New York and San Francisco Giants who taught Willie Mays his distinctive "basket catch."
February 13 – George Britt, 76, played every position (primarily a pitcher and catcher) over a Negro leagues and Black baseball career that stretched from 1917 to 1944.
February 15 – Cotton Pippen, 69, pitcher for the St. Louis Cardinals, Philadelphia Athletics and Detroit Tigers from 1936 to 1940, better known as the pitcher that struck out Ted Williams in his first major league at-bat.
February 19 – Sam Barnes, 81, second baseman for the Detroit Tigers in the 1921 season.
February 22 – Andy High, 83, National League third baseman who hit .284 in 1,314 games for five different teams (1922–1934), and a member of the St. Louis Cardinals 1931 World Series champions; longtime scout and scouting director of Brooklyn and Los Angeles Dodgers; brother of Hugh and Charlie High.
February 23 – Myrl Brown, 86, pitcher who posted a 3–1 record in seven games for the 1922 Pittsburgh Pirates.
February 25 – Frank McCrea, 84, catcher who played but one MLB game, on September 26, 1925, for the Cleveland Indians.
February 27 – Pepper Bassett, 70, catcher and six-time All-Star who played in the Negro leagues between 1935 and 1948, notably for the Birmingham Black Barons, Chicago American Giants and Pittsburgh Crawfords.

March
March    6 – Wade Lefler, 84, backup outfielder who played for the Boston Braves and Washington Senators during the 1924 season.
March   8 – Gowell Claset, 73, pitcher for the 1933 Philadelphia Athletics of the American League.
March 10 – Bob Elson, 76, broadcaster for the Chicago White Sox from 1931 to 1970, who also worked with the Chicago Cubs and Oakland Athletics.
March 11 – Vince Gonzales, 55, Cuban-born Mexican pitcher who played with the Washington Senators in 1955.
March 17 – Paul Dean, 67, pitcher who joined his older brother Dizzy on the St. Louis Cardinals, winning 19 games in each of his first two seasons – the brothers each won two games in the 1934 World Series.
March 17 – Joe Giebel, 89, backup catcher in three games for the 1913 Philadelphia Athletics.
March 19 – Zinn Beck, 95, backup infielder who played for the St. Louis Cardinals and New York Yankees, hitting .226 in 124 games between 1913 and 1918; longtime scout for Washington Senators and Minnesota Twins.
March 19 – Frank Lane, 86, nicknamed "Frantic Frank" and "Trader Lane", general manager of the Chicago White Sox (1948–1955), St. Louis Cardinals (1955–1957), Cleveland Indians (1957–1960), Kansas City Athletics (1961) and Milwaukee Brewers (1971–1972) known for constantly churning his rosters through trades.
March 20 – Charles Beverly, 80, southpaw who pitched for five Negro leagues clubs between 1925 and 1939; led Negro National League in games lost (12) in 1925.
March 20 – Gee Walker, 73, All-Star outfielder who played from 1931 through 1945 for the Detroit Tigers, Chicago White Sox, Washington Senators, Cleveland Indians and Cincinnati Reds, collecting a career batting average of .294, 1,991 hits, 223 stolen bases, and 124 home runs.
March 24 – Charlie Hughes, 74, second baseman/shortstop who appeared for six Negro National League teams in only three seasons (1933–1934, 1938)
March 25 – Red Morgan, 97, third baseman for the 1906 Boston Americans, at the time of his death the oldest living former major leaguer.
March 28 – Don Pelham, 72, outfielder and player-manager for the Atlanta Black Crackers of the Negro American League in 1938.

April
April   2 – Ben Rochefort, 84, first baseman who appeared in two games with the Philadelphia Athletics in 1914.
April   3 – Clayton Lambert, 64, Cincinnati Reds pitcher in the 1946 and 1947 seasons.
April   6 – Steve Mesner, 63, third baseman for the Cubs, Cardinals and Reds in parts of six seasons, who led the National League for the most assists in 1945.
April   6 – Dick Seay, 76, three-time All-Star and second baseman/shortstop whose Negro leagues career spanned 1926 to 1947.
April 12 – Dick Hoover, 55, relief pitcher for the 1952 Boston Braves of the National League.
April 16 – Effa Manley, 84, owner of the Negro leagues' Newark Eagles from 1935 to 1948.
April 27 – Emerson Dickman, 66, pitcher for the Boston Red Sox between 1936 and 1941, who later became a coach at Princeton University in the 1950s.

May
May   8 – Earle Brucker Sr., 80, backup catcher who broke into majors at advanced age of 36 and played 241 games over five seasons (1937–1940 and 1943) for Philadelphia Athletics, batting .290; coached for Athletics (1941–1949), St. Louis Browns (1950) and Cincinnati Reds (1952), serving as acting manager of Reds that year for five games (July 30 to August 3), going 3–2; his son and namesake, also a catcher, had brief 1948 trial with Athletics.
May   8 – Eddie Onslow, 88, first baseman who played 64 total games for the 1912–1913 Detroit Tigers, 1918 Cleveland Indians and 1927 Washington Senators, later a scout; spent two decades as a player or player-manager in the minor leagues, and elected to International League Hall of Fame in 1951; brother Jack had long MLB career as a catcher, coach, scout and manager.
May 11 – Sammy Byrd, 73, outfielder, pinch hitter and pinch runner who got into 745 career games for the New York Yankees (1929–1934) and Cincinnati Reds (1935–1936).
May 16 – Jim Finigan, 52, two-time All-Star second baseman and third baseman who played from 1954 to 1959 for the Philadelphia/Kansas City Athletics, Detroit Tigers, San Francisco Giants and Baltimore Orioles.
May 22 – Bill Bayne, 82, southpaw pitcher who appeared in 199 MLB games for the 1919–1925 St. Louis Browns, 1928 Cleveland Indians and 1929–1930 Boston Red Sox.
May 22 – Pen Gilliard, 77, who played in the Negro American League in 1937 and 1938, primarily as an outfielder.
May 23 – Gene Green, 47, outfielder/catcher who played in 408 games from 1957–1963 for the St. Louis Cardinals, Baltimore Orioles, expansion Washington Senators, Cleveland Indians and Cincinnati Reds.
May 26 – Bartolo Portuondo, 87, Havana native and third baseman for the 1920–1922 Kansas City Monarchs of the Negro National League and the 1923–1928 Cuban Stars East of the Eastern Colored League.
May 24 – Don Richmond, 61, third baseman who appeared in 56 career games for Philadelphia Athletics (1941 and 1946–1947) and St. Louis Cardinals (1951); minor-league star and member of International League Hall of Fame.
May 26 – George Smith, 79, pitcher who played from 1926 to 1930 for the Detroit Tigers and Boston Red Sox.

June
June   2 – Skinny O'Neal, 82, pitcher who worked in 13 total MLB games for the Philadelphia Phillies (1925, 1927).
June 18 – Honey Barnes, 81, catcher who appeared in only one major-league game, on April 20, 1926, for the New York Yankees; played two innings in the field and drew a base on balls in his lone plate appearance.
June 27 – Sam McConnell, 86, third baseman who appeared in six games for the last-place 1915 Philadelphia Athletics.

July
July   1 – Dan Daniel, 91, sportswriter for The Sporting News and various New York newspapers for over 50 years; also a member of baseball's Rules Committee.
July   3 – George Knothe, 83, second baseman in six games for 1932 Philadelphia Phillies; his brother was also a National League infielder.
July   8 – Bradford Bennett, 64, Tuskegee Institute graduate and outfielder for the St. Louis/New Orleans Stars and New York Black Yankees of the Negro leagues between 1940 and 1942.
July   8 – Merl Combs, 61, shortstop for the Boston Red Sox, Washington Senators and Cleveland Indians between 1947 and 1952.
July   8 – "Wild Bill" Hallahan, 78, southpaw hurler and three-time World Series champion (1926, 1931, 1934) for the St. Louis Cardinals; went 2–0 with two complete-game wins and a save in three appearances during the 1931 Fall Classic, helping the Cards dethrone the favored Philadelphia Athletics; also pitched for the Cincinnati Reds and Philadelphia Phillies in a 12-season career spanning 1925 to 1938.

August
August   2 – Dorothy Maguire, 62, All-Star catcher and member of two championship teams in the All-American Girls Professional Baseball League.
August   3 – Jim McLeod, 72, third baseman and shortstop who appeared in 92 games for the Washington Senators (1930, 1932) and Philadelphia Phillies (1933).
August   9 – Sammy T. Hughes, 70, six-time All-Star second baseman of the Negro leagues, mainly with the Elite Giants.
August 11 – Walt Huntzinger, 82, pitcher who appeared in 60 games between 1923 and 1926 for the New York Giants, St. Louis Cardinals and Chicago Cubs.
August 12 – George Lyons, 90, pitched in a total of 33 games with the St. Louis Cardinals and the St. Louis Browns in the 1920s.
August 31 – Roy Parmelee, 74, pitcher who went 59–55 (4.27) in 206 career games with New York Giants (1929–1935), St. Louis Cardinals (1936), Chicago Cubs (1937) and Philadelphia Athletics (1939).

September
September   2 – George Lowe, 86, relief pitcher for the 1920 Cincinnati Reds.
September   6 – Eddie Ainsmith, 91, Russian-born catcher who appeared in 1,078 games over 15 seasons (1910–1924) for five clubs, principally the Washington Senators, St. Louis Cardinals and Detroit Tigers.
September   9 – Willie Haynes, 80, pitcher and outfielder who appeared in the Negro leagues between 1920 and 1932.
September   9 – Johnny Stevens, 69, American League umpire whose 26-year (1948–1971, 1973, 1975) tenure included 3,345 league games, four World Series, and five All-Star games.
September 15 – Earl Caldwell, 76, pitcher who played professionally for 29 consecutive seasons (1926–1954), including 200 games pitched for Philadelphia Phillies (1928), St. Louis Browns (1935–1937), Chicago White Sox (1945–1948) and Boston Red Sox (1948).
September 13 – León Kellman, 54, legendary Panamanian catcher/manager who led his teams to three championships; also a four-time Negro league All-Star, as well as the first player in Mexican baseball history to hit two grand slams in the same game.
September 20 – Harry Fisher, 55, Canadian pitcher and pinch hitter who appeared in 16 games for the 1951–1952 Pirates, eight of them on the mound.
September 21 – Al Bool, 84, catcher who played in 129 total games over three one-year trials with the 1928 Washington Senators, 1930 Pittsburgh Pirates and 1931 Boston Braves.

October
October   4 – Freddie Lindstrom, 75, Hall of Fame third baseman for the New York Giants who batted .311 lifetime, twice collecting 230 hits and batting .333 in the 1924 World Series at age 18; later coach at Northwestern.
October   8 – Bill Nagel, 66, infielder who played in 189 games during the 1939, 1941 and 1945 seasons for the Philadelphia Athletics, Philadelphia Phillies and Chicago White Sox.
October 12 – Art Passarella, 71, American League umpire from 1941 to 1953; worked in three World Series and two All-Star games.
October 13 – Jack Knott, 74, pitcher who appeared in 325 games for the St. Louis Browns, Chicago White Sox and Philadelphia Athletics over 11 seasons (1933–1942 and 1946).
October 17 – Johnny Peacock, 71, catcher for the Boston Red Sox, Philadelphia Phillies and Brooklyn Dodgers, between 1937 and 1945.
October 18 – Lou Ciola, 59, pitcher in 12 games for the wartime 1943 Philadelphia Athletics.
October 21 – Gene Robertson, 81, lefty-swinging third baseman who played in 656 MLB games over nine seasons between 1919 and 1930, mostly for the St. Louis Browns; member of 1928 World Series champion New York Yankees.
October 21 – Hubert Wilson, 79, pitcher who posted an 8–2 (3.21 ERA) record for the 1928–1929 Kansas City Monarchs of the Negro National League.
October 22 – Taffy Wright, 70, outfielder for the Washington Senators, Chicago White Sox and Philadelphia Athletics from 1938–1942 and 1946–1949; batted .311 with 1,115 hits in 1,029 career MLB games.
October 25 – Pete Reiser, 62, three-time All-Star center fielder for the Brooklyn Dodgers (1940–1942 and 1946–1948) who led the National League in batting and four other categories in 1941 and in steals twice, but whose fearless defensive style led to numerous injuries and a decline in performance; also played for Boston Braves, Pittsburgh Pirates and Cleveland Indians from 1949–1952; later a coach for the Los Angeles Dodgers, Chicago Cubs and California Angels during the 1960s and 1970s.
October 26 – Harry Hoch, 94, pitcher who went 2–7 (4.35 ERA) in 30 games for the 1908 Philadelphia Phillies and 1914–1915 St. Louis Browns.
October 31 – Fred Archer, 71, left-handed pitcher who made seven appearances for 1936–1937 Philadelphia Athletics.

November
November   2 – Hugh East, 62, pitcher for the New York Giants in a span of three seasons from 1941–1943; later a longtime scout.
November   3 – Al Jurisich, 60, pitcher in 104 career games for 1944–1945 St. Louis Cardinals and 1946–1947 Philadelphia Phillies; member of the 1944 Cardinals World Series champions.
November   3 – Theolic Smith, 68, pitcher and occasional outfielder who played in the Negro leagues, the independent Mexican League, and the Pacific Coast League between 1936 and 1955.
November 10 – Ed Lagger, 69, pitcher who appeared in eight games for the 1934 Philadelphia Athletics.
November 13 – Alex Radcliff, 76, thirteen-time All-Star third baseman and Negro leagues standout whose career spanned 1926 to 1946, primarily as a member of the Chicago American Giants; hit .369 to win 1943 Negro American League batting title. 
November 15 – Steve Macko, 27, middle infielder and third baseman who played for the Chicago Cubs in the 1979 and 1980 seasons.
November 17 – Red Shea, 82, pitcher for the Philadelphia Athletics and New York Giants in parts of three seasons spanning 1918–1922.
November 27 – Frank Betcher, 93, backup infielder in 35 games for the 1910 St. Louis Cardinals.

December
December   1 – Tony Piet, 74, second baseman and third baseman who played in 744 games over eight seasons (1931–1938) for the Pittsburgh Pirates, Cincinnati Reds, Chicago White Sox and Detroit Tigers. 
December   3 – Walter Cannady, 79, infielder whose career in Black baseball extended from 1921 to 1945; selected All-Star third baseman in 1938 while playing for the New York Black Yankees of the Negro National League.
December   4 – Stan Hollmig, 55, outfielder and pinch hitter for the 1949–1951 Philadelphia Phillies, appearing in 94 games in all; later, a scout.
December   7 – Juan Padrón, 89, left-handed pitcher whose career in Black baseball, the Negro leagues and Cuban Winter League extended from 1915 to 1926; led Negro National League in shutouts twice (1922, 1924) while hurling for the Chicago American Giants.
December   9 – Ernie Alten, 86, southpaw who pitched in 14 games for the 1920 Detroit Tigers.
December 10 – Bob Joyce, 66, pitcher who appeared in 43 total MLB games for the 1939 Philadelphia Athletics and 1946 New York Giants; star hurler in Pacific Coast League during World War II era, winning over 20 games for four straight years (1942–1945), including posting a 31–11 (2.17) record for the 1945 San Francisco Seals.
December 10 – John F. Kieran, 89, New York sportswriter and radio and television personality who authored books on numerous subjects.
December 10 – Freddy Leach, 84, outfielder who batted .307 with 1,147 hits over ten seasons (1923–1932) with the Philadelphia Phillies, New York Giants and Boston Braves.
December 15 – Tom Glass, 83, relief pitcher who worked in two games for the Philadelphia Athletics in June 1925, but won his only decision.
December 15 – Jack Wisner, 82, pitcher who hurled in 51 games for 1919–1920 Pittsburgh Pirates and 1925–1926 New York Giants.
December 18 – Jake Brown, 33, outfielder and pinch hitter who appeared in 41 games for the 1975 San Francisco Giants.
December 20 – Bob Stewart, 66, American League umpire from 1958 to 1970 who worked in 1,958 regular season games, two All-Star matches, and three World Series, including during his final season.
December 22 – Ed Gallagher, 71, pitcher for the 1932 Boston Red Sox.
December 23 – George Scharein, 67, shortstop and second baseman who appeared in 388 games for the 1937–1940 Philadelphia Phillies; brother of Art Scharein.
December 28 – John Bischoff, 87, catcher for the Chicago White Sox and Boston Red Sox in the 1920s, and one of the first foreign ballplayers to play in Cuban baseball.
December 30 – Josh Billings, 90, backup catcher in all or parts of 11 American League seasons with Cleveland (1913–1918) and St. Louis (1919–1923).

Sources